Naval Air Weapons Station (NAWS) China Lake is a large military installation in California that supports the research, testing and evaluation programs of the United States Navy. It is part of Navy Region Southwest under Commander, Navy Installations Command, and was originally known as Naval Ordnance Test Station (NOTS).

Occupying land in three counties – Kern, San Bernardino, and Inyo – the installation's closest neighbors are the city of Ridgecrest and the communities of Inyokern, Trona, and Darwin.

China Lake is the United States Navy's largest single landholding, representing 85% of the Navy's land for weapons and armaments research, development, acquisition, testing and evaluation (RDAT&E) use and 38% of the Navy's land holdings worldwide. As of 2010, at least 95% of that land has been left undeveloped.

The  of restricted and controlled airspace at China Lake makes up 12% of California's total airspace. Jointly controlled by NAWS China Lake, Edwards Air Force Base and Fort Irwin, this airspace is known as the R-2508 Special Use Airspace Complex.

A 7.1 magnitude earthquake on July 5, 2019, whose epicenter was within the boundaries of NAWS China Lake, resulted in the facility being temporarily evaluated as "not mission capable” due to damage.

Armitage Field 

More than 20,000 crewed and uncrewed military sorties are conducted out of Armitage by U.S. Armed Forces each year.

Foreign military personnel also use the airfield and range to conduct more than 1,000 test and evaluation operations each year.

Tenant commands 

The 620 active duty military, 4,166 civilian employees and 1,734 contractors that make up China Lake's workforce are employed across multiple tenant commands, including:

 Naval Air Warfare Center Weapons Division
 Air Test and Evaluation Squadron 9 (VX-9)
 Air Test and Evaluation Squadron 31 (VX-31)
 Marine Aviation Detachment
 Explosive Ordnance Disposal Mobile Unit 3 Detachment
 Explosive Ordnance Disposal Testing and Evaluation Unit 1
 Naval Facilities Engineering Command Southwest Detachment
 Naval Construction Training Center Port Hueneme (Seabees)

History 
China Lake is a dry lake. The operation was known locally as "The Little Chinese Borax Works".

Naval Ordnance Test Station (NOTS)
In the midst of World War II, adequate facilities were needed by the California Institute of Technology (Caltech) for test and evaluation of rockets. At the same time, the Navy needed a new proving ground for aviation ordnance. Caltech's Charles C. Lauritsen and then U.S. Navy Commander Sherman E. Burroughs worked together to find a site that would meet both their needs.

In the early 1930s, an emergency landing field had been built by the Works Progress Administration in the Mojave Desert near the small town of Inyokern, California. Opened in 1935, the field was acquired by the United States Army Air Forces (USAAF) in 1942. In November 1943 it was transferred to the Navy, which established China Lake as the Naval Ordnance Test Station (NOTS).

The NOTS mission was defined in a letter by the Secretary of the Navy as ".... a station having for its primary function the research, development and testing of weapons, and having additional function of furnishing primary training in the use of such weapons." Testing began within a month of the Station's formal establishment. The vast and sparsely populated desert with near perfect flying weather and practically unlimited visibility, proved an ideal location not only for test and evaluation activities, but also for a complete research and development establishment.

During 1944, NOTS worked on the development and testing of the 3.5-inch, 5-inch, HVAR and 11.75-inch (Tiny Tim) rockets.

The airfield was opened on 1 June 1945, and named Armitage Field after Navy Lieutenant John Armitage, who was killed while testing a Tiny Tim rocket at NOTS in August 1944.

Work done by Caltech at NOTS for the Manhattan Project - particularly the testing of bomb shapes dropped from B-29s - was included as part of codename Project Camel.

In 1950, NOTS scientists and engineers developed the air-intercept missile (AIM) 9 Sidewinder, which became the world's most used and most copied air-to-air missile. Other rockets and missiles developed or tested at China Lake include the Mighty Mouse, Zuni, Shrike, HARM, Joint Stand-Off Weapon (JSOW) and Joint Direct Attack Munition (JDAM). In June 1963, President John F. Kennedy visited NAWS China Lake for an air show and to see Michelson Lab.

Naval Weapons Center

In July 1967, NOTS China Lake and the Naval Ordnance Laboratory in Corona, California, became the Naval Weapons Center. The Corona facilities were closed and their functions transferred to the desert in 1971. In July 1979, the mission and functions of the National Parachute Test Range at Naval Air Facility El Centro were transferred to China Lake.

Naval Air Weapons Station
In January 1992, the Naval Weapons Center and the Pacific Missile Test Center Point Mugu were disestablished and joined with naval units at Kirtland AFB in Albuquerque and at the White Sands Missile Range at White Sands, NM as a single command - the Naval Air Warfare Center Weapons Division (NAWCWD) of the Naval Air Systems Command (NAVAIR). At the same time, the physical plant at China Lake was designated as a Naval Air Weapons Station and became host of the NAVAIR Weapons Division, performing the base-keeping functions.

In 1982 the community area of China Lake, including most of base housing, was annexed by the City of Ridgecrest. In 2013, Congress reserved China Lake's acreage for military use for an additional 25 years.

In 2014, U.S. Representative Kevin McCarthy of California introduced a bill to permanently designate Naval Air Weapons Station China Lake property for military use, arguing it would save taxpayer money and enhance the base's mission. The bill would add , including about  that were part of a bombing range in San Bernardino County, as well as  along the station's southwest boundary. The Bureau of Land Management said that DoD needs could change in future decades and that it is a popular recreation area with trail riding, camp sites and hunting, and an important wildlife corridor, especially for the threatened desert tortoise.

In July 2019, two large earthquakes struck Southern California; both had epicenters within the NAWS boundaries. The first, on July 4, a 6.4 magnitude quake, caused no injuries at NAWS, and the initial reports showed that all buildings were intact.  The second, a 7.1 magnitude earthquake on July 5, resulted in the facility being evaluated as "not mission capable”. The report shows that officials assessed all buildings, utilities and facilities — 3,598 structures in all — for 13 days after the earthquakes and found damage totaled $5.2 billion. Replacing buildings alone would cost $2.2 billion, but officials also must replace or repair specialized equipment, furniture, machine tools, telecommunication assets and other facilities.

Weapons developed at China Lake 

AAM-N-5 Meteor
AIM-9 Sidewinder
AGM-45 Shrike
AGM-62 Walleye
BOAR (rocket)
China Lake Grenade Launcher
CL-20
Gimlet (rocket)
Holy Moses (rocket)
Hopi (missile)
LTV-N-4
Ram (rocket)
RUR-4 Weapon Alpha
SLAM-ER
Terasca
Tiny Tim (rocket)
Tomahawk missile

Other notable projects
 Glowstick
 NOTS-EV-1 Pilot

Environment

Wildlife 
The majority of the land at NAWS China Lake is undeveloped and provides habitat for more than 340 species of wildlife, including feral horses, feral burros (donkeys), bighorn  sheep and endangered animals, such as the desert tortoise, Mojave ground squirrel and Mojave tui chub. The Mojave tui chub was introduced to China Lake's Lark Seep in 1971. Lark Seep is fed by the water outflow from a waste water treatment plant located at China Lake. The tui chub population has since grown and expanded to a population of around 6,000 in 2003. The desert on which the installation is built is home to 650 plant types.

Petroglyphs 

The area was once home to the Native American Coso People, whose presence is marked by thousands of archaeological sites; the Coso traded with other tribes as far away as San Luis Obispo County, California. This locale was also a site used by European miners and settlers whose cabins and mining structures are extant throughout the Station.

The precise age of the petroglyphs is unknown. A broad range of dates can be inferred from archaeological sites in the area and some artifact forms depicted on the rocks. Archaeologists do not agree on their age, but in general it is believed that most petroglyphs are between one and three thousand years old. Designs range from animals to abstract to anthropomorphic figures. Opinions vary widely whether the petroglyphs were made for ceremonial purposes, whether they are telling stories to pass along the mythology of their makers, or whether they are records of hunting hopes or successes, clan symbols or maps.

Declared a National Historic Landmark in 1964, the rock art in Little Petroglyph Canyon provides insights into the cultural heritage and knowledge of the desert's past. Everything in the canyon area is protected, including the obsidian chips and any artifacts or tools, as well as the petroglyphs and native vegetation and wildlife.

Little Petroglyph Canyon contains 20,000 documented images. It is open to the public for tours.

Monorail 
Remains of the Epsom Salts Monorail are signposted and visible within the site. The central rail, on which mining tractors pulled minerals from a mine to the nearest railway siding, was supported on wooden A frames of a low trestle.

Coso Geothermal Field 
The Coso Geothermal Field is located within China Lake boundaries. The geothermal power plants located there began generating electricity in 1987 and were the Navy's first foray into producing clean power from the earth's thermal energy (heat). The plant's nameplate capacity is 270 megawatts with a total annual electricity production from the field of 1,175 gigawatt-hours.

See also 
 Nevada Test and Training Range
 Space Test and Training Range
 Utah Test and Training Range
 Big and Little Petroglyph Canyons
 List of airports in Kern County, California
 List of United States Navy airfields

References

External links 

Official sites
Official Naval Air Weapons Station website
NAVAIR Home
NAVAIR Weapons Division
Air Test and Evaluation Squadron Nine
Air Test and Evaluation Squadron Thirty One

Museum
Naval History & Heritage Command (History.navy.mil):  U.S. Naval Museum of Armament and Technology at China Lake — official website
Chinalakemuseum.org: U.S. Naval China Lake Museum of Armament and Technology
Chinalakemuseum.org: U.S. Naval China Lake Museum of Armament and Technology Foundation website

Other
2002 NAWS China Lake Welcome brochure
GlobalSecurity.org: China Lake 
Astronautix.com: China Lake
The California State Military Museum
China Lake Alumni.org
AirTime, Spring 2007, Volume 3, Issue 1

China Lake logos including the "rocket-ridin' rabbit"

Naval Air Weapons Station China Lake
Installations of the United States Navy in California
United States Naval Air Stations
Naval Air Weapons Station China Lake
Naval Air Weapons Station China Lake
Buildings and structures in Inyo County, California
Buildings and structures in Kern County, California
Buildings and structures in San Bernardino County, California
Geography of Inyo County, California
Geography of Kern County, California
Geography of San Bernardino County, California
Historic American Buildings Survey in California
Historic American Engineering Record in California
Naval Air Weapons Station China Lake
Naval Air Weapons Station China Lake
Naval Air Weapons Station China Lake
1943 establishments in California